Diversidoris is a genus of sea slugs, dorid nudibranchs, shell-less marine gastropod mollusks in the family Chromodorididae. This clade is supported by molecular phylogeny.

Species 
Species in the genus Diversidoris include:

References

Chromodorididae